Drangedal Station is a railway station located in Prestestranda in Drangedal, Norway on Sørlandet Line. The station is served by express trains to Kristiansand and Oslo.

History
The station was opened in 1927 when Sørlandet Line was opened to Kragerø Station.

References

External links
 Jernbaneverket's page on Drangedal 

Railway stations on the Sørlandet Line
Railway stations in Vestfold og Telemark
Railway stations opened in 1927
1927 establishments in Norway
Drangedal